Vivek-Hans Sain Kalra (born 1994), known as Viveik Kalra, is an English actor of Indian descent. His breakout role came in 2019's Blinded by the Light,  directed by Gurinder Chadha.

Early life and education
Kalra was born in Windsor and Maidenhead, Berkshire, England, to a British-born Indian father and Indian mother. He was raised in Windsor, where he became a fan of Indian films and American hip hop. He was in his first year at the Royal Welsh College of Music & Drama in Cardiff in 2016 when he left after being cast in his first role.

Career
Kalra's first job was in the 2018 ITV miniseries Next of Kin, which came after he sent a video audition. In 2019, he also starred in another ITV miniseries, Gurinder Chadha's historical drama Beecham House. He was cast as Javed Khan in Blinded by the Light, about a British-Pakistani teen inspired by Bruce Springsteen in 1987, after singing "Born to Run" in the audition. For his role as Javed, Kalra was nominated as Best Actor at the 2019 SIFF.

He stars as Peter in the science fiction film Voyagers, along with Tye Sheridan, Fionn Whitehead, Colin Farrell and Lily-Rose Depp.

In 2022, he starred as Troye Sivan's love interest in the film, Three Months.

Filmography

References

External links

Living people
1998 births
English male film actors
English male television actors
People from the Royal Borough of Windsor and Maidenhead
British male actors of Indian descent
21st-century English male actors
English people of Indian descent
Male actors from Berkshire
Alumni of the Royal Welsh College of Music & Drama